Platanares is a district of the Pérez Zeledón canton, in the San José province of Costa Rica.

History 
Platanares was created on 13 May 1966 by Decreto Ejecutivo 2. Segregated from San Pedro.

Geography 
Platanares has an area of  km² and an elevation of  metres.

Demographics 

For the 2011 census, Platanares had a population of  inhabitants.

Transportation

Road transportation 
The district is covered by the following road routes:
 National Route 244
 National Route 329

References 

Districts of San José Province
Populated places in San José Province